Mariya Khan is a Pakistani actress, model, host and voice actress. She is known for her drama roles in Baba Jani, Hari Hari Churiyaan and Hiddat.

Biography and career
Mariya was born on October 10, 1988 in Quetta, Pakistan. She completed her studies from St. Joseph's College with (B.A). She joined the industry in 2000. She did hosting on many channels such as Kay2 TV channel, Suno Pakistan FM 89.4. She also did voice acting, she did many urdu dubs on Turkish dramas and also at ARY Digital. She started her acting in 2009 on PTV Channel. She also appeared in British film Kandahar Break as Ayesha. She did a lot lead roles on PTV dramas such as Moum and Daag e Nadamaat. She was also known for her role in drama Waada with Faysal Qureshi and also in drama Mere Jevan Sathi. She was praised for doing both negative and positive characters. She also did modeling for many designers, companies and magazines. She appeared in drama Hari Hari Churiyaan as Nausheen in 2017. In 2018 she appeared in drama Baba Jani, Meri Guriya and Ishq Mein Kaafir.

Filmography

Television

Film

Awards and nominations
 PTV National Award Winner Actress

References

External links
 
 
 

1988 births
Living people
Pakistani television actresses
21st-century Pakistani actresses